Axis of Evil is fifth album by the Belgian aggrotech act Suicide Commando.

Track listing
"Cause of Death: Suicide"
"Consume Your Vengeance"
"Face of Death"
"The Reformation"
"One Nation Under God"
"Mordfabrik"
"Evildoer"
"Sterbehilfe"
"Plastik Christ"
"Neuro Suspension"

References

Suicide Commando albums
2003 albums